Chess Oscar was an international award given annually to the best chess player. The winner was selected by votes that were cast by chess journalists from across the world.
The traditional voting procedure was to request hundreds of chess journalists from many countries to submit a list of the ten best players of the year. The voters were journalists who knew the game and followed it closely, and so the honor was highly prized. The award itself took the form of a bronze statuette representing a man in a boat. The prize was created and awarded in 1967 by Spanish journalist Jorge Puig, and the International Association of Chess Press (AIP). The awards were given from 1967 until 1988. Then, after a pause, they resumed in 1995, and were then organized by the Russian chess magazine 64.

64 ceased publication in 2014, and the awards have not been made since.

Statuette
The statuette's final form, a man in a boat, was carved by the sculptor Alexander Smirnov. It represented a figure known as "The Fascinated Wanderer", which refers to a short story written in 1873 by 19th-century Russian author Nikolai Leskov. In this story, the title character, Ivan Flyagin, is a horse trainer and a brute of a man. From his birth his mother has promised that Ivan's life would be devoted to the church. Ivan spends many years avoiding this fate, but eventually gives in and becomes a monk, not for spiritual reasons, but due to a poverty of opportunity.

The Chess Oscar statuette originally took the form of "The Lady of the Umbrella", a figure based on a statue in Parc de la Ciutadella in Barcelona, Spain.

Winners
{| class="sortable wikitable"
!Year !!Player !!Country
|-
| 1967 ||  || 
|-
| 1968 ||  || 
|-
| 1969 ||  || 
|-
| 1970 ||  || 
|-
| 1971 ||  || 
|-
| 1972 ||  || 
|-
| 1973 ||  || 
|-
| 1974 ||  || 
|-
| 1975 ||  || 
|-
| 1976 ||  || 
|-
| 1977 ||  || 
|-
| 1978 ||  || 
|-
| 1979 ||  || 
|-
| 1980 ||  || 
|-
| 1981 ||  || 
|-
| 1982 ||  || 
|-
| 1983 ||  || 
|-
| 1984 ||  || 
|-
| 1985 ||  || 
|-
| 1986 ||  || 
|-
| 1987 ||  || 
|-
| 1988 ||  || 
|-
| 1989–94 || no awards || 
|-
| 1995 ||  || 
|-
| 1996 ||  || 
|-
| 1997 ||  || 
|-
| 1998 ||  || 
|-
| 1999 ||  || 
|-
| 2000 ||  || 
|-
| 2001 ||  || 
|-
| 2002 ||  || 
|-
| 2003 ||  || 
|-
| 2004 ||  || 
|-
| 2005 ||  || 
|-
| 2006 ||  || 
|-
| 2007 ||  || 
|-
| 2008 ||  || 
|-
| 2009 ||  || 
|-
| 2010 ||  || 
|-
| 2011 ||  || 
|-
| 2012 ||  || 
|-
| 2013 ||  || 
|}

By person
{| class="sortable wikitable"
!Player !!Country !!Wins
|-
|  || , later   || 11
|-
|  ||  || 9
|-
|  ||  || 6
|-
|  ||  || 5
|-
|  ||  || 3
|-
|  ||  || 2
|-
|  ||  || 2
|-
|  ||  || 1
|-
|  ||  || 1
|-
|  ||  || 1
|}

By nation
{| class="sortable wikitable"
!Country !!Wins
|-
|  || 17
|-
|  || 7
|-
|  || 6
|-
|  || 5
|-
|  || 3
|-
|  || 1
|-
|  || 1
|-
|  || 1
|}

References

Oscar
1967 in chess
1995 in chess
Awards established in 1967